Ávila is a province of central-western Spain, in the southern part of the autonomous community of Castile and León. It is bordered on the south by the provinces of Toledo and Cáceres, on the west by Salamanca, on the north by Valladolid, and on the east by Segovia and Madrid. Ávila has a population of 158,265 (2018) and is ranked 47th out of 50 of Spanish provinces in population. Its capital is Ávila.

Geography

Ávila is naturally divided into two sections, differing completely in soil and climate. The northern portion is generally level; the soil is of indifferent quality, strong and marly in a few places, but rocky in all the valleys of the Sierra de Ávila; and the climate alternates from severe cold in winter to extreme heat in summer. The population of this part is mainly agricultural. The southern division, however, is one mass of rugged granitic sierras, interspersed with sheltered and well-watered valleys, abounding with rich vegetation.

The winter here, especially in the elevated region of the Paramera and the waste lands of Ávila, is long and severe, but the climate is not unhealthy.

Pico Almanzor is the highest point. The ridges which ramify from the Paramera are covered with valuable forests of beeches, oaks and firs, presenting a striking contrast to the bare peaks of the Sierra de Gredos.

The main rivers stemming from the Sierra de Gredos are the Alberche, the Tiétar, and the Tormes. The first two belong to the Tagus basin, while the latter belongs to the Douro catchment area. Meanwhile, the Adaja, another Douro tributary whose source lies at the cut-off point of the Sierra de Ávila and La Serrota, carries little water in the Summer.

History
The first recorded inhabitants of Ávila were the Celts, who left behind a number of large stone statues of bulls called Verracos, with the largest number of surviving examples in Ávila. The area of the province was conquered by the Romans around 192 B.C. After the Roman Empire fell, the area became part of the Visigothic Kingdom, and it is from this period we have many of the earliest records of the towns of Ávila.

The population of the territory comprising the current-day province of Ávila greatly decreased since the late 16th century and the first half of the 17th century, taking over nearly two centuries to recover the late 16th century population.

See also
List of municipalities in Ávila

References
Citations

Bibliography